Forficula lesnei, or Lesne's earwig, is a species of earwig from Europe, particularly Britain. It also lacks hind wings. It can be found dwelling on the shrub Clematis vitalba.

References 

Forficulidae
Insects described in 1887
Insects of Europe